The First Christian Church (also known as the Greater Mount Lily Baptist Church) is an historic church in Pensacola, Florida. It is located at 619 East Gadsden Street. On April 14, 1994, it was added to the U.S. National Register of Historic Places.

References and external links

 Escambia County listings at National Register of Historic Places
 Florida's Office of Cultural and Historical Programs
 Escambia County listings
 Greater Mount Lily Baptist Church

Baptist churches in Florida
Churches in Pensacola, Florida
National Register of Historic Places in Escambia County, Florida
Churches on the National Register of Historic Places in Florida
Churches in Escambia County, Florida